"What's on Your Radio" is a song by Australian rock band the Living End, released as the first single from their fourth studio album, State of Emergency (2006). The song was released on 21 November 2005 and reached number nine in Australia. "What's on Your Radio" was voted to number 49 in the Triple J Hottest 100 for 2005. In the United Kingdom, the single was released as a download and limited-edition red 7-inch single.

Track listings
Australian CD single
 "What's on Your Radio" – 3:07
 "Reborn" – 3:49
 "Wrong Side of the Tracks" – 2:53

Coke Live 'n' Local CD single
 "What's on Your Radio"
 "I Can't Give You What I Haven't Got" (live at Splendour)
 "West End Riot" (live at Splendour)

UK 7-inch red vinyl
A. "What's on Your Radio"
B. "We Want More"

Charts

References

2005 singles
2005 songs
Capitol Records singles
The Living End songs
Song recordings produced by Nick Launay
Songs written by Chris Cheney